Rupert Roopnaraine (born 31 January 1943) is a Guyanese cricketer, writer, and politician. Roopnaraine served as Minister of Education of Guyana between 2015 and 2017.

Biography
Roopnaraine was born in Kitty, Georgetown, Guyana. In 1954, he won a scholarship to Queen's College, where he excelled in cricket; he captained the team and represented Demerara in the Inter-county Cricket Finals. In 1962 he was awarded a Guyana scholarship to attend St John's College, Cambridge, where he studied Romance languages. He played first-class cricket for the Cambridge University team from 1964 to 1966 and was awarded a Blue for representing the university in the annual University Match against Oxford in 1965 and 1966. As a cricketer, he was a lower order right-handed batsman and a right-arm off-break bowler.

In 1970 he was awarded a scholarship to Cornell University, New York, where he obtained an MA and PhD in Comparative Literature. From 1976 to 1996, he has worked as a university lecturer in the UK, Canada, the US and at the University of Guyana.

Politics
He joined the Working People's Alliance (WPA) in Guyana in 1977 and became one of the leaders of the party, along with Walter Rodney, Clive Y. Thomas and Eusi Kwayana. He was an activist politician and at the height of the years of People's National Congress (PNC) repression was arrested on charges of burning down the PNC headquarters. He also narrowly escaped death when he was attacked by PNC party thugs, only reaching safety with the help of sugarcane workers who led him through the cane fields to escape. After the assassination of Walter Rodney, Roopnaraine became leader of the WPA.

In 2015, Roopnaraine was appointed Minister of Education of Guyana. In 2017, he was reassigned to Ministry of the Presidency, and Nicolette Henry replaced him as Minister of Education.

Author
Roopnaraine is one of the leading Caribbean intellectuals of his generation, though political activism has restricted his output. Nevertheless, he is an art critic (champion of the work of Stanley Greaves), literary critic (author of a pioneering essay on Martin Carter), film-maker (The Terror and the Time) and poet. He is the author of The Web of October: Rereading Martin Carter (1986), a suite of love poems entitled Suite for Supriya (1993), and Primacy of the Eye: The Art of Stanley Greaves was published in 2003. Roopnaraine also contributed a substantial "Introduction" to the Peepal Tree Press 2010 edition of Edgar Mittelholzer's Shadows Move Among Them.

Roopnaraine's collection of essays, The Sky’s Wild Noise, won the non-fiction category of the 2013 OCM Bocas Prize for Caribbean Literature. The judges commentated that "in the corpus of non-fiction prose in the Caribbean intellectual tradition, only José Martí and George Lamming rival the range of Roopnaraine’s capacities of response, depth of analysis and subtle and mordant style."

Selected works
 The Web of October: Rereading Martin Carter (Peepal Tree Press, 1986)
 Suite for Supriya (love poems; Peepal Tree Press, 1993)
 Primacy of the Eye: The Art of Stanley Greaves (Peepal Tree Press, 2003)
 The Sky’s Wild Noise: Selected Essays (Peepal Tree Press, 2012)

References

Living people
1943 births
Guyanese writers
Alumni of Queen's College, Guyana
Alumni of St John's College, Cambridge
Cornell University alumni
Guyanese cricketers
Cambridge University cricketers
International Cavaliers cricketers
Working People's Alliance politicians
Members of the National Assembly (Guyana)
People from Georgetown, Guyana
Guyanese politicians of Indian descent
21st-century essayists
20th-century Guyanese writers
Cambridgeshire cricketers
Guyanese essayists
Guyanese activists
Government ministers of Guyana